Bob Krouse (born February 21, 1943, in Hamilton, Ontario) is a former professional Canadian football linebacker who played thirteen seasons in the Canadian Football League for the Hamilton Tiger-Cats. He was a part of the Tiger-Cats 1963, 1965, 1967 and 1972 Grey Cup winning teams.

A case involving the use of Bob Krouse's image, Krouse v Chrysler Canada Ltd, was the earliest Canadian law case to recognize the tort of appropriation of personality.

References

1943 births
Living people
Canadian football linebackers
Hamilton Tiger-Cats players
Players of Canadian football from Ontario
Sportspeople from Hamilton, Ontario